Karel Lavrih (1915-1998) was a Yugoslav cyclist, who rode for Hermes Ljubljana and later Fortuna Belgrade. He was third on Yugoslav National Road Race Championships in 1938 and on Tour of Serbia in 1939.

References

1915 births
Yugoslav male cyclists
Sportspeople from Ljubljana
1998 deaths